The Honda P50 (known as the P25 in some markets) was introduced in June 1966. It was the last motor-wheel moped design by Honda (and probably by any other large manufacturer).

The P50 features a step-through frame made from steel pressings, leading-link front suspension, plastic fenders and chainguard. The fuel tank is located above the rear fender, and the key distinguishing feature of the design is the  engine being located at the extreme lower left rear of the frame, with all of the driveline components housed within the large hub of the rear wheel.

The engine is also 4-stroke — unusual when almost all pedal-equipped mopeds used simpler 2-strokes. Soichiro Honda disliked the sharp noise of 2-strokes, and the 4-stroke does not require oil to be mixed with the gasoline at every fill-up.

References

 Infobox specifications from these pages on 2008-02-23: 
http://www.honda.co.jp/sou50/Hworld/Hall/2r/67.html
http://www.honda.co.jp/pressroom/library/motor/scooter/pal/t_index.html

External links
Little Honda P25 brochure at Product Design Data Base 

P50
Motorcycles introduced in 1966